Beta-defensin 2 (BD-2) also known as skin-antimicrobial peptide 1 (SAP1) is a peptide that in humans is encoded by the DEFB4 (defensin, beta 4) gene.

Human beta-defensin-2 (hBD-2) is a cysteine-rich cationic low molecular weight antimicrobial peptide recently discovered in lesional skin.

Structure 
hBD-2 is a protein whose primary structure is made by 64 aminoacids. At concentrations ≤2.4 mM, hBD-2 is monomeric. The structure is amphiphilic with a nonuniform surface distribution of positive charge and contains several key structural elements, including a triple-stranded, antiparallel beta sheet with strands 2 and 3 in a beta hairpin conformation. 
The determination of other structural elements depends on the technique used. When X-ray crystallography is used an alpha helix can be observed at the N-terminal end of the protein (PDB codes: ,, and ). When using NMR this alpha-helix does not appear, however this structure was determined using a truncated version of hBD-2 which was missing the initial 4 amino acids, and may be the reason for the discrepancy.

Function 
Defensins form a family of microbicidal and cytotoxic peptides made by neutrophils. Members of the defensin family are highly similar in protein sequence. Beta-defensin 2 is an antibiotic peptide which is locally regulated by inflammation.

Human beta-defensin 2 is produced by a number of epithelial cells and exhibits potent antimicrobial activity against Gram-negative bacteria and Candida, but not Gram-positive S. aureus.  It has been speculated that beta-defensin 2 may contribute to the infrequency of Gram-negative infections on skin and lung tissue.

hBD-2 represents the first human defensin that is produced following stimulation of epithelial cells by contact with microorganisms such as P. aeruginosa or cytokines such as TNF-alpha and IL-1 beta. The HBD-2 gene and protein are locally expressed in keratinocytes associated with inflammatory skin lesions. It is intriguing to speculate that HBD-2 is a dynamic component of the local epithelial defense system of the skin and respiratory tract having a role to protect surfaces from infection, and providing a possible reason why skin and lung infections with Gram-negative bacteria are rather rare.

Although this protein doesn’t have any antibacterial activity against Gram-positive bacteria, there is a study showing that there is a synergy between hBD-2 and other proteins. One example of this synergistic effect is with epiP, a protein segregated by some strains of S. epidermidis. hBD2, holding hands with epiP, is capable of killing S. aureus, a Gram-positive bacteria responsible of human diseases.

References

External links

Further reading 

 
 
 
 
 
 
 
 
 
 
 
 
 
 
 
 
 

Defensins